L.A. Witch is an American garage-rock trio formed in Los Angeles, California in 2011. Founded by L.A. natives Sade Sanchez (vocals, guitar) and Irita Pai (bass), the band's sound has been described as a "mix of forlorn psych folk, lethargic lo-fi blues and boozy garage rock drones steeped in moody, drugged-out surf reverb." The group's influences include Black Sabbath, The Brian Jonestown Massacre, and seminal L.A. punk rock bands X and the Gun Club.

History

Formation
Sanchez formed the all female group when her then-boyfriend forbade her from playing with male musicians. Asked to come up with a name, the band chose its current name after discovering its first choice, Witch, was taken. Drummer Ellie English replaced original drummer Crystal Nava after the latter left for New York City and didn't return.

Influences

The band cites Gun Club as one of its early influences, with Sanchez noting that "When our band first met, that was one of the connections we made. There’s something about their vibe — it’s blues-y, twang-y, kind of country, but also poetic and goth-y — that inspired me."

Touring and Recording
The band toured extensively before releasing its eponymous debut album in 2017, recorded 
at Hurley Studios in Costa Mesa and mixed in Highland Park, Los Angeles.
 Their second album, Play With Fire, was released in 2020, followed by a cover of the Gun Club's Ghost on the Highway. The band tours frequently in the U.S. and internationally. Joining the band on its 2022 European tour was guitarist Lauren Andino of the Los Angeles-based duo Tremours.

Discography

Albums
2020 - Play With Fire 
2017 - L.A. Witch

Singles
2021 - One Way or the Highway
2020 - Gen-Z
2018 - Octubre
2017 - Drive Your Car
2017 - Untitled
2016 - Brian
2015 - Kill My Baby Tonight
2015 - Drive Your Car
2012 - Your Ways
2013 - L.A. Witch

References

External links 
 L.A. Witch
 Suicide Squeeze Records

Musical groups from Los Angeles
Garage rock groups from California
American musical trios
All-female bands
Musical groups established in 2011
Suicide Squeeze Records artists
2011 establishments in California